Roy Fares (born 16 September 1984) is a Lebanese-born Swedish pastry chef, author and TV personality.

Biography
Fares was born in Lebanon.  In 1990, he came to Sweden with his family. He grew up in Örebro and now lives in Stockholm. Roy's cousins are Josef Fares and Fares Fares.

Roy Fares attended a three-year high school culinary program in Örebro, with focus on bakery/pastry chef. Roy received his pastry chef apprentice diploma in 2005. In the same year, he won the Swedish Championship for Young Bakers and came third in the European Championship for Young Bakers. After his competition successes, Roy Fares started working at the baker Tössebageriet in Stockholm.

In 2010, Roy Fares won the competition "Årets Konditor" (Pastry Chef of the Year), which is Sweden's largest competition for professional pastry chefs.

In the autumn of 2012, he released his first book, "Sweet!", inspired by Swedish, French and American desserts. In 2013, he participated as one of three judges in the TV program Dessertmästarna (The Masters of Desserts) on Kanal 5 and released his second baking book "United States of Cakes". The book was titled the World's Best Cookbook 2014 in the category of US cuisine by the Gourmand World Cookbook Awards.

In 2011, Roy Fares also participated as pastry chef in the TV program Go'kväll (Good Evening) on SVT. Since 2013 is Roy a part of TV4's cooking program Mitt Kök (My Kitchen).

In 2014, Roy Fares released his third book "Delicious", an interpretation of the classic baking book Sju Sorters Kakor (Seven Types of Cookies). In April 2015, he made his debut as host of Kanal 5's TV series "United States of Cakes", based on Fares' book of the same name.

In 2014, Roy was named Chicest Man of the Year by the Swedish magazine CHIC.

In 2016, he received the award for the Best Dressed Man of the Year from ELLE Sweden.

Books
 Sweet!, Bonnier Fakta, 2012
 United States of Cakes, Bonnier Fakta, 2013
 Delicious, Bonnier Fakta, 2014

TV appearances
 Go'kväll, Sveriges Television
 Dessertmästarna, Kanal 5
 Mitt Kök, TV4
 United States of Cakes, Kanal 5

References

Living people
1984 births
Pastry chefs
Lebanese emigrants to Sweden
Cookbook writers
Swedish television chefs